This is a list of unidentified shipwrecks that have been located in Australian waters. Many of these shipwrecks are unable to be accessed so specific locations are not given. Some of these wreck sites have not been given official confirmation and the details are provided here.

Queensland
(1842) Unidentified Mount Ernest Island
An unidentified vessel floated onto a reef near Mount Ernest Island, where some of the crew members were massacred. The sole remaining occupant remained on the vessel, which drifted free at high tide and ran aground on Mount Ernest Island. The sole remaining occupant was massacred, and the vessel was looted. In 1929, the rudder of the vessel and other scattered wooden wreckage was still visible.

(1869) Unidentified Breaksea Spit, Fraser Island
Workers erecting a lighthouse were notified by local Aboriginal natives of the presence of a shipwreck some four miles from Breaksea Spit. The wreck site consisted of a timber hull buried upside down in the sand, along with various sundry items including a tea chest, bars of soap, a portion of a box of candles and several bottles of gin. The wreck was never identified.

(1973) Unidentified Orchid Beach, Fraser Island
A portion of an as of yet unidentified vessel was spotted just offshore of Orchid Beach, Fraser Island. The wreckage included a timber spar and a cannonade. The wreckage is buried beneath several metres of sand, but was unearthed as recently as 2002.

(1976) Unidentified Inskip Point
The remains of a 19th-century wooden sailing ship were exposed during a storm in 1976 between Rainbow Beach and Inskip Point.   It is believed to be the remains of the barque Saint Magnus, which drifted ashore in a storm during 1875. The wreck was recently exposed during a storm in 2002-2003.

 (1989) Unidentified Cockburn Reef
The site was reported to the Maritime Authority in 1989 and consists of several anchors, spars and timbers, sandstone ballast, chains and other assorted debris.

(1999) Unidentified North Ledge Reef
A fisherman discovered the wreckage of an unidentified shipwreck on the eastern edge of North Ledge Reef. There are no official records of any shipwrecks in that specific location. The debris area is scattered over a wide area, and consists of iron ballast, a cannon embedded in a reef formation. It is surrounded by iron fittings, and some 50 metres away from the main wreckage, an iron water tank protrudes above the waterline.

(1999) Unidentified Jervis Reef
A resident of Badu Island located what is believed to be the remains of a vessel on the southern side of Jervis Reef. It includes an anchor chain and stone ballast. This is not the remains of the French vessel Pauline et Victory, wrecked on the northern side of Jervis Reef.

(2000) Unidentified Wednesday Island
The wreck site lies on the northern side of the island in a depth of seven metres of water. The only possible candidate for this wreck is the twelve ton iron ketch Gertrude, lost on the island in 1912. The wreck site consists of an anchor attached to the intact bow, which protrudes above the waterline at low tide. The hull has iron sheathing and various other structural debris.

(2004) Unidentified Goods Island
The wreck of an unidentified timber vessel was located offshore of the pearling station at Goods Island. Stern posts, hoop pine wooden planking and wooden ribs as well as what appears to be a diesel engine are present at the wreck site.

(2004) Unidentified Goods Island
The wreck of an unidentified commercial fisheries vessel lies beached just above the high water mark, off the southern side of the island. The vessel has a steel superstructure, and is broken in half, but in a relatively good condition. The freezer on the vessel is still present.

(2004) Unidentified Collis Beach, Prince of Wales Island
The wreck of an unidentified vessel is exposed offshore of Collis Beach at low tide. Parts of the wreck are scattered down a reef slope to a depth of six metres. It appears to be an old coal hulk, with wreckage including ironwork, scattered timbers and an iron mast that protrudes above the waterline.

(2011) Unidentified Hinchinbrook Island
A wooden shipwreck some thirty metres in length was located on a beach on Hinchinbrook Island after Cyclone Yasi. It could be the remains of a number of vessels wrecked in the 19th century. The remains include the hull and a windless protruding from the sand.

References 

Unidentified
Shipwrecks, unidentified
Australia
unidentified